Rhede is a municipality in the Emsland district, Lower Saxony, Germany. It is situated on the river Ems, near the border with the Netherlands, approx. 10 km west of Papenburg, and 20 km southeast of Winschoten.

References

Germany–Netherlands border crossings
Emsland